Sonic the Hedgehog is an ongoing American comic book series based on the Sega video game franchise, published by IDW Publishing. It is the third licensed comic book iteration based on Sega's Sonic the Hedgehog intellectual property, after Fleetway Publications' Sonic the Comic and Archie Comics' Sonic the Hedgehog series.

Publication history
On July 21, 2017, IDW Publishing announced a deal with Sega to produce a new series of Sonic comics following the cancellation of the previous Sonic the Hedgehog series by Archie Comics after a 24-year run. The new series began with a four-week long event where the first four issues were released each week in April 2018, followed by a monthly release of subsequent issues starting in May 2018. Archie Sonic writer Ian Flynn was later confirmed to return as the series' lead writer, alongside artist Tyson Hesse.

During New York Comic Con 2017, Ian Flynn confirmed that characters old and new would be featured in the series, hinting that characters from the games and the original comics might possibly return. In January 2018, IDW revealed that Tracy Yardley, who originally worked on Archie's Sonic the Hedgehog comics, would be one of the pencillers for the IDW series.

On April 14, 2020, it was announced that Evan Stanley, one of the series' artists, would be writing for the series.

On June 28, 2020, two original characters from the series, Tangle the Lemur and Whisper the Wolf, were announced to appear in the Sonic mobile game Sonic Forces: Speed Battle as part of its events, with them doing so next month. Merchandise, including a plush toy, of the two have been released also. Tangle was also briefly mentioned in the 2022 Sonic game Sonic Frontiers.

Synopsis
The comic is set in a similar universe as the video games after the events of Sonic Forces and follows the adventures of Sonic and his friends as they thwart Doctor Eggman and other villains.

After the end of the war, Eggman has genuinely lost his memory and ended up in a remote village where he has taken on the more friendly moniker of Mr. Tinker. Sonic learns that Neo Metal Sonic is now leading the Badniks, plotting to take over the world in Eggman's stead. While Sonic and his friends fight Neo Metal Sonic and his army on Angel Island, an Eggman admirer named Starline kidnaps Mr. Tinker and successfully reverts him back to Eggman after a defeated Metal Sonic returns to him.

Eggman's next scheme involves the Metal Virus, which turns organic material into mindless robots dubbed "Zombots", but it quickly mutates beyond his control.  Starline brings in the Deadly Six in hopes that they can control the Zombots, but they betray him.  This leads to a falling-out between Starline and Eggman and forces the latter to help Sonic and his friends cure the world.

Afterwards, Sonic and company decide to fix E-123 Omega, whose body was destroyed during the plague.  Sonic and Tails investigate an Eggman base to find the blueprints while Rouge, Amy, Cream, and Cheese enter a competition to win parts; the former group discovers a peaceful Badnik created by Mr. Tinker named Belle while the latter comes into conflict with former crime boss Clutch.  Meanwhile, Starline, hoping to regain Eggman's respect and rejoin him by proving his own superiority, sets his own plans in motion by allying himself with villains like Zavok and stalking Sonic's friends. Zavok reunites the Deadly Six and they attack the Restoration's home base, but are defeated and banished to their homeworld of Lost Hex.

From the bio-data he has collected from Sonic and Tails, Starline creates Surge and Kitsunami, two cyborgs meant to replace them and end the status quo between Sonic and Eggman.  Upon learning that he has been conditioning them and wiping their memories to create their personalities and being unable to find any trace of their past, Surge and Kit vow to destroy all heroes and villains.  Starline, oblivious, moves to accomplish his vision by conquering the Eggman Empire's new capital, Eggperial City, which is expanding itself until it covers the entire planet, and lures Sonic and Tails there. However, Eggman kills Starline for his treason, while Kit flees with Surge in tow after several defeats incapacitate her. Afterwards, the Restoration turns their attention on bringing down the Eggperial City.

Characters

New characters to the series include:

 Tangle the Lemur – an energetic ring-tailed lemur who can elongate her tail for use in combat. She is briefly mentioned in the mainline game Sonic Frontiers.
 Whisper the Wolf – a reserved wolf who uses a Wisp-powered rifle and becomes Tangle's best friend. She was formerly a member of an anti-Eggman mercenary group called the Diamond Cutters.
 Jewel the Beetle – a beetle museum curator and Tangle's childhood friend who later becomes the newest Restoration leader following the Metal Virus pandemic.
 Belle the Tinkerer – a clumsy but kindhearted marionette-like robot created by Eggman when he was "Mr. Tinker".
 Lanolin the Sheep – a nervous sheep who joins the Restoration after Sonic and Amy saved her village.
 Doctor Starline – a platypus scientist who admires Eggman.  He dies at Eggman's hands after trying to take over his empire.
 Rough & Tumble – a pair of trouble-making skunk brothers and former mercenaries.
 Mimic – a shapeshifting mimic octopus and former comrade of Whisper who betrayed his team to Eggman.
 Surge the Tenrec – a punkish cyborg lowland streaked tenrec created by Starline to be Sonic's doppelgänger, who is deeply traumatized by Starline's experiments.
 Kitsunami "Kit" the Fennec – a somber cyborg fennec fox created by Starline to be Tails' doppelgänger and Surge's sidekick, who is also deeply traumatized by Starline's experiments.
 Clutch the Opossum – an opossum crime boss and former abusive Chao racing champion who seeks to revive his criminal empire after his new occupation is exposed.

Publications

Main

One-shots

Graphic novel

Reprints
 Sonic the Hedgehog Issue 1–4 Box Set (June 27, 2018) (collects issues #1–4)
 Sonic the Hedgehog Volume 1: Fallout! (September 18, 2018) (a reprint of #1–4)
 Sonic the Hedgehog Volume 2: The Fate of Dr. Eggman (February 19, 2019) (a reprint of #5–8)
 Team Sonic Racing Plus Deluxe Turbo Championship Edition one-shot (May 22, 2019) (a reprint of the story featured in Team Sonic Racing One-Shot, which also includes bonus features)
 Sonic the Hedgehog: Bonds of Friendship (2019) (a Scholastic-exclusive collection of several reprinted issues in the Sonic the Hedgehog comic series)
 Sonic the Hedgehog Volume 3: Battle For Angel Island (July 23, 2019) (a reprint of #9–12)
 Sonic the Hedgehog Volume 4: Infection (September 3, 2019) (a reprint of #13–16)
 Sonic the Hedgehog: Tangle & Whisper Box Set (December 4, 2019) (collects issues #1–4)
 Sonic the Hedgehog: Tangle & Whisper (April 14, 2020) (a reprint of Tangle & Whisper issues #1–4 including the 2019 Annual)
 Sonic the Hedgehog Volume 5: Crisis City (February 11, 2020) (a reprint of #17–20)
 Sonic the Hedgehog Volume 6: The Last Minute (June 23, 2020) (a reprint of #21–24)
 Sonic the Hedgehog Volume 7: All or Nothing (December 8, 2020) (a reprint of #25–29)
 Sonic the Hedgehog Volume 8: Out of the Blue (March 30, 2021) (a reprint of #30–32 including the 2020 Annual)
 Sonic the Hedgehog: Bad Guys (May 11, 2021) (a reprint of Bad Guys issues #1–4)
 Sonic the Hedgehog Volume 9: Chao Races & Badnik Bases (January 11, 2022) (a reprint of #33–36)
 Sonic the Hedgehog: Sonic & Tails: Best Buds Forever (February 23, 2022) (a reprint of stories from #1, #13, #34 and #35)
 Sonic the Hedgehog Volume 10: Test Run! (March 22, 2022) (a reprint of #37–40)
 Sonic the Hedgehog Volume 11: Zeti Hunt! (June 7, 2022) (a reprint of #41-44)
 Sonic the Hedgehog Volume 12: Trial by Fire (September 13, 2022) (a reprint of #45–49)
 Sonic the Hedgehog: Imposter Syndrome (October 11, 2022) (a reprint of Imposter Syndrome issues #1–4)
 Sonic the Hedgehog Volume 13: Battle for the Empire (February 7, 2023) (a reprint of #50-51 including the 2022 Annual)
 Sonic the Hedgehog Volume 14: Overpowered (June 20, 2023) (a reprint of #52-56)
 Sonic the Hedgehog: Scrapnik Island (August 29, 2023) (a reprint of Scrapnik Island issues #1–4)
 Sonic the Hedgehog Volume 15: Urban Warfare (October 3, 2023) (a reprint of #57-61)

The IDW Collection
 Sonic the Hedgehog: The IDW Collection, Vol. 1 (June 8, 2021) (a reprint of Issues #1–12)
 Sonic the Hedgehog: The IDW Collection, Vol. 2 (March 15, 2022) (a reprint of Issues #13–20, including the 2019 Annual and the Tangle & Whisper miniseries.)
 Sonic the Hedgehog: The IDW Collection, Vol. 3 (March 14, 2023) (a reprint of Issues #21–32, including the 2020 Annual.)

Reception
Joshua Davison on Bleeding Cool gave the first issue a score of 6.5/10, praising the art and creativity of the story but criticizing Sonic's characterization: "Sonic is an insufferable character... He's smug, annoying, and radical in that 1990's sense."

Dustin Holland's review of the first issue of the Imposter Syndrome miniseries on Comic Book Resources praised the personalities of new villains Surge the Tenrec and Kit the Fennec, action-filled plot, and appropriately expressive art.

References

External links

 

Sonic the Hedgehog
2018 comics debuts
Comics based on Sonic the Hedgehog
IDW Publishing titles
Comic book reboots
Action-adventure comics
Comedy-drama comics
Horror comics
Psychological thrillers
Thriller comics
Science fantasy comics
Superhero comics
Comic books suspended due to the COVID-19 pandemic
Zombies in comics
Apocalyptic comics
Child abuse in fiction